INS Hosdurg (K73) was the third ship of the Durg class corvettes of the Indian Navy. The ship was commissioned on 15 January 1978 and decommissioned on 5 June 1999. The ship was named after Hosdurg Fort, a fort in Kerala. It was built at Leningrad, Russia.

Decommissioning
The Hosdurg was decommissioned on 5 June 1999. In June 2000, she was sunk in a test of a long-range Sea Eagle Anti-Ship Missile fired by a Jaguar of the Indian Air Force.

References 

Durg-class corvettes
Corvettes of the Cold War